The Ministry of Works, Transport and Communications is a government ministry of Tanzania. It was created in 2010 and is responsible for promoting a quality, efficient, environmentally friendly, and cost-effective construction industry that facilitates the social and economic development of the country.

References 

W
Tanzania